The Unfortunate Return of the Ridiculously Self-Indulgent, Ill-Advised Vanity Tour is an ongoing concert tour hosted by American musician and satirist "Weird Al" Yankovic. The tour is a follow-up to the format of Yankovic's 2018 Ridiculously Self-Indulgent, Ill-Advised Vanity Tour. To that end, his website states that the tour will consist mostly of his original, non-parody songs. The tour began on April 26, 2022 at the Bardavon 1869 Opera House in Poughkeepsie, United States, and is scheduled to end on March 26, 2023 at the Castle Theater in Kahului, United States.

Background
The tour was announced on December 3, 2021. Yankovic had stated that the tour will be "scaled down with limited production in smaller theatres and intimate settings", as well as stating that he will be performing his original non-parody songs, exclaiming that the 2018 tour was the most fun he ever had and wanted to do it again. Emo Philips was also announced as the opening act for the tour, which he had previously been on Yankovic's 2018 tour. On May 18, 2022, Yankovic postponed his performances in Saginaw, Detroit, Nashville and Springfield after testing positive for COVID-19.

Setlist
Each performance features a different setlist. As of May 17, 2022, the following songs have been in regular rotation:

"Airline Amy"
"Albuquerque"
"The Biggest Ball of Twine in Minnesota"
"Bob"
"Buy Me a Condo"
"Christmas at Ground Zero"
"Close but No Cigar"
"CNR"
"Craigslist"
"Dare to Be Stupid" (lounge version)
"Dog Eat Dog"
"Don't Download This Song"
"First World Problems"
"Frank's 2000" TV"
"Fun Zone"
"Generic Blues"
"Good Old Days"
"I Remember Larry"
"I'll Sue Ya"
"Lame Claim to Fame"
"Let Me Be Your Hog"
"Melanie"
"Midnight Star"
"Mr. Popeil"
"My Baby's in Love With Eddie Vedder"
"My Own Eyes"
"Nature Trail to Hell"
"The Night Santa Went Crazy"
"One More Minute"
"Skipper Dan"
"UHF"
"Velvet Elvis"
"When I Was Your Age"
"Why Does This Always Happen to Me?"
"You Don't Love Me Anymore"
"Young, Dumb & Ugly"
"Your Horoscope for Today"
Unplugged Medley ("Amish Paradise", "Smells Like Nirvana", "White & Nerdy", "Word Crimes", "Yoda")

Tour dates

 Notes

References 

"Weird Al" Yankovic concert tours
2022 concert tours
2023 concert tours
Concert tours of North America
Concert tours of Europe
Concert tours of Australia